A music award is an award or prize given for skill or distinction in music. There are different awards in different countries, and different awards may focus on or exclude certain music. For example, some music awards are only for classical music and include no popular music. Some music awards are academic, some are commercial and created by the music industry.

Major music award
Grammy Awards
Juno Awards
The BRITs

International music awards

Classic Rock Roll of Honour Awards – an annual awards program bestowed by Classic Rock
Ernst von Siemens Music Prize
Llangollen International Musical Eisteddfod
Grawemeyer Award for Music Composition
Herbert von Karajan Music Prize (Festspielhaus Baden-Baden)
Léonie Sonning Music Prize (Léonie Sonning Music Foundation)
MTV Video Music Awards (MTV)
Polar Music Prize – for International recognition of excellence in the world of music
Rolf Schock Prize in Musical Arts
Sibelius Prize
Winter Music Conference (electronic dance music)
YouTube Music Awards

By region

Africa

MTV Africa Music Awards (MTV)
All Africa Music Awards (African Union)
Headies (Nigeria)
Soundcity MVP Awards Festival (Nigeria)
City People Entertainment Awards (Nigeria)
Nigeria Entertainment Awards (Nigeria)
Vodafone Ghana Music Awards (Ghana)
3Music Awards (Ghana)
South African Hip Hop Awards (South Africa)
South African Music Awards (South Africa)
Star FM Music Awards (Zimbabwe)

Americas

The Big Three major music awards given each season are the American Music Awards (held in the Fall), the Grammy Award (generally held the week after the NFL’s Super Bowl), and the Billboard Music Awards (held in May).

A fourth major award, the Rock and Roll Hall of Fame Induction Ceremony, is given in the spring (between the Grammys and the BMAs), and currently honors artists who have been in the business at least 25 years since their first hit record.  Among other mini-major music awards are the Glenn Gould Prize, and Pulitzer Prize for Music.

Academy of Country Music Awards
Alternative Press Music Awards
American Academy of Arts and Letters Gold Medal in Music
American Country Awards
American Country Countdown Awards
American Music Awards 
ASCAP awards (American Society of Composers, Authors and Publishers)
Billboard Music Awards
BET Awards (Black Entertainment Television, United States)
CMT Music Awards (USA)
Country Music Association Awards
Distinguished Service to Music Medal (Kappa Kappa Psi) – for exceptional service to American bands and band music
GAMIQ Awards (Quebec)
George Peabody Medal (Peabody Institute)
Gershwin Prize (Library of Congress)
Grammy Awards (National Academy of Recording Arts and Sciences)
Heat Latin Music Awards
iHeartRadio Music Awards
iHeartRadio MMVAs (originally an initialism of Much Music Video Awards)
Juno Awards (Canadian Academy of Recording Arts and Sciences)
K-Love Fan Awards (USA)
Latin American Music Award 
Latin Grammy Award (Latin Academy of Recording Arts & Sciences)
Latin Awards Canada 
Lo Nuestro Awards (USA)
Los Premios MTV Latinoamérica – previously known as "MTV Video Music Awards Latinoamérica" (MTV)
MTV Video Music Awards (MTV)
NAACP Image Awards (United States)
People's Choice Awards 
Premios Juventud
Pulitzer Prize for Music
Rock and Roll Hall of Fame Induction Ceremony
Stellar Awards (Gospel)
Soul Train Music Award 
Teen Choice Awards 
Telehit Awards (Mexico)

Asia

Anugerah Musik Indonesia 
Anugerah Planet Muzik (Indonesia, Malaysia)
Awit Awards (Philippine Association of the Record Industry)
Dedication Music Award (Vietnam)
Gaon Chart Music Awards (South Korea) 
Golden Disc Awards (South Korea) 
Golden Melody Awards (Taiwan)
Indonesian Choice Awards
Indonesian Dangdut Awards
Korean Hip-hop Awards (South Korea) 
Korean Music Awards (South Korea) 
Korean Popular Culture and Arts Awards (South Korea) 
MBC Plus X Genie Music Awards (South Korea) 
Melon Music Awards (South Korea) 
Mirchi Music Awards (India)
Mnet Asian Music Awards (South Korea) 
MTV Asia Awards (MTV)
MTV Video Music Awards Japan (MTV)
Myx Music Awards (Philippines)
Otaka Prize – an annual composition prize for Japanese composers
Praemium Imperiale (Japan)
Seoul Music Awards (South Korea) 
Soribada Best K-Music Awards (South Korea) 
Suntory Music Award (Japan)

Europe

Akil Koci Prize (Albania)
BBC Music Awards (United Kingdom, BBC Music)
BBC Radio Scotland Young Traditional Musician (Scotland)
BBC Radio 2 Folk Awards (United Kingdom)
BBC Radio 2 Young Folk Award (United Kingdom)
Bourges International Electro-Acoustic Music Competition
BAFTA Anthony Asquith Award (British Academy of Film and Television Arts)
Brit Awards (British Phonographic Industry)
Comet (Viva, Germany)
 Danish Music Awards
Echo (German Phonographic Academy)
Edison Award (NVPI)
European Border Breakers Award (Europe)
Fryderyk (Poland) 
Fonogram Awards (Hungary) 
Gold Badge Awards – for outstanding contributions to the music and the entertainment industry of the United Kingdom
Golden Globes (Portugal)
Grand Prix du Disque (France)
Handel Prize (City of Halle, Germany)
Ivor Novello Awards (British Academy of Songwriters, Composers and Authors)
LOS40 Music Awards (Spain)
Malta Music Awards (Malta)
MG Alba Scots Trad Music Awards (Scotland)
Mercury Prize (United Kingdom)
MOBO Awards (United Kingdom)
MTV Europe Music Awards (MTV)
NRJ Music Awards (France)
NME Awards  
PLAY - Portuguese Music Awards (Portugal)
Preis der deutschen Schallplattenkritik – for achievement in recorded music
Premio Lunezia (Italy)
Premios Juventud 
Prix de Rome
Sanremo Music Festival (Italy)
Silver Clef Award (UK)
Spellemannprisen (Norway) – considered as the Norwegian Grammys that honor Norwegian artists who have made a mark in the Norway music industry. 
The Lukas (UK)
Victoires de la Musique (France)

Oceania

ARIA Music Awards (Australian Recording Industry Association)
APRA Awards (Australia)
Country Music Awards of Australia (Country Music Association of Australia)
MTV Australia Awards (MTV)

See also
 Lists of awards
 List of music awards honoring women
 List of writing awards#Songwriting awards

References

Lists of music awards